Calvin may refer to:

Names
 Calvin (given name)
 Particularly Calvin Coolidge, 30th President of the United States
 Calvin (surname)
 Particularly John Calvin, theologian

Places

In the United States 
 Calvin, Arkansas, a hamlet
 Calvin Township, Jewell County, Kansas
 Calvin, Louisiana, a village
 Calvin Township, Michigan
 Calvin crater, an impact crater
 Calvin, North Dakota, a city
 Calvin, Oklahoma, a town
 Calvin, Virginia
 Calvin, West Virginia, an unincorporated community

Elsewhere
 Calvin, Ontario, Canada, a township
 Mount Calvin, Victoria Land, Antarctica

Schools
 Calvin University (South Korea), a Presbyterian-affiliated university in South Korea
 Calvin University, Grand Rapids, Michigan
 Calvin Theological Seminary, Grand Rapids, Michigan
 Calvin High School (disambiguation), various American schools
 Calvin Christian School (Escondido, California)
 Calvin Christian School (Kingston, Tasmania)
 Collège Calvin, the oldest public secondary school in Geneva, Switzerland; founded by John Calvin

Other uses
 Hurricane Calvin (disambiguation), various Pacific Ocean cyclones
 Calvin Cycle, a biochemical system involved in production of sugars
 Calvin (horse), an American Thoroughbred racehorse and winner of the 1875 Belmont Stakes
 Susan Calvin, fictional robopsychologist in Isaac Asimov's short stories
 Calvin Company, a defunct educational and industrial film production company
 Calvin (Calvin and Hobbes), a comic strip character
 Calvin, a novel by Martine Leavitt about a mentally ill teenager's obsession with the comic strip character

See also
 Calvinism